Colin Quirke (born 17 June 1990) is an Irish-American Discus thrower from Los Gatos, California.

Major Competition
Colin Quirke represented Ireland at World Youth Championships in Athletics and the World Junior Championships in Athletics, making the finals in the shot put and setting a national junior record (63’5). He holds the Irish national junior record in the discus throw and shot put.

NCAA
From 2008-10, Colin Quirke represented University of Oklahoma and from 2010-2012, Colin Quirke represented Manhattan College '12 as an NCAA Division I thrower. Colin received NCAA Division 1 All-American honors in the Discus Throw. He was named the MAAC Conference Most-Outstanding Performer in both 2011 and 2012 setting a Championship record in the Discus Throw.

Prep
Colin Quirke's father is the Irish Shot Put national record holder. Colin finished 2nd at Los Gatos High School in California Interscholastic Federation where he was runner-up at 2008 CIF California State Meet and third at 2007 CIF California State Meet both in Shot put.

References

External links 
 
 Colin Quirke Discus all-athletic profile

1990 births
Living people
Irish shot putters
Irish discus throwers
Sportspeople from Santa Clara County, California
Sportspeople from Santa Barbara, California
Manhattan Jaspers track and field athletes
Oklahoma Sooners men's track and field athletes